Dowlatabad (also Romanized as Dowlatābād) is a village in Azari Rural District, in the Central District of Esfarayen County, North Khorasan Province, Iran. At the 2006 census, its population was 316, in 66 families.

References 

Populated places in Esfarayen County